Charles Russell Donaldson (February 2, 1919 – October 9, 1987) was an American attorney and jurist who served as a justice of the Idaho Supreme Court for more than eighteen years, including the last four years as chief justice. He was elected to the court in November 1968, and served from early 1969 until his death in October 1987.

Education 
Donaldson received his Bachelor of Laws from the University of Idaho College of Law and was admitted to the Idaho State Bar in 1948.

Career 
Before his election to the state supreme court, Donaldson was appointed as a district judge in Ada County. He was known for his district court opinion in Reed v. Reed in which he ruled that men could not be preferred in the selection of estate administrators; Donaldson's decision was affirmed by the United States Supreme Court in November 1971.

He is the namesake for Donaldson Peak in Custer County.

References

In Memoriam: Justice Charles R. Donaldson – 1919–1987. 25 Idaho L. Rev. 1 (1988–1989).

Justices of the Idaho Supreme Court
1919 births
1987 deaths
University of Idaho College of Law alumni
Chief Justices of the Idaho Supreme Court
20th-century American judges